The Herrmann wall telephone, also known as the "privileged phone", was a type of telephone, created by the Portuguese inventor, Maximiliano Augusto Herrmann, in 1880.  The pioneering use of buttons to activate the telephone played a fundamental role to the opening of public lines in the main cities of Portugal.  The telephone was composed by a double earpiece, made with long flexible tubes, and a transmitter fixed to main body of the machine.

Its inventor, Maximiliano Augusto Herrmann (1832–1913), worked for the North and East Portuguese Railway Company as telegraph lines inspector.  He later opened a workshop in Lisbon dedicated to the production of precision instruments.

See also
Telecommunications in Portugal

References

Portuguese inventions
Telephony